was a Japanese politician. He was born in Shizuoka Prefecture. He graduated from the University of Tokyo. He was governor of Aomori Prefecture (1939-1940) and Nagano Prefecture (1940-1942). He was mayor of Kure, Hiroshima (1942-1946).

References

Bibliography
 Nagano Prefecture 『Nagano Prefecture政史』
 赤羽篤外編 『Nagano Prefecture歴史人物大事典』郷土出版社、1989.

1893 births
20th-century deaths
Year of death uncertain
Governors of Aomori Prefecture
Governors of Nagano
Japanese Home Ministry government officials
Japanese Police Bureau government officials
University of Tokyo alumni
Politicians from Shizuoka Prefecture